Tyson Pencer (born February 10, 1989) is a Canadian football offensive lineman who is currently a free agent. He was ranked as the ninth best player in the Canadian Football League’s Amateur Scouting Bureau September rankings for players eligible in the 2012 CFL Draft.  After redshirting for the 2008 season, Pencer played his freshman and sophomore seasons for the Washington State Cougars in 2009 and 2010. He left the program for personal reasons and played for the Okanagan Sun of the Canadian Junior Football League in 2011.

Professional career

Winnipeg Blue Bombers
Pencer was selected 3rd overall in the 2012 CFL Draft by the Winnipeg Blue Bombers of Canadian Football League. He signed with the team on May 30, 2012.  He was released on June 12, 2014

Edmonton Eskimos
Pencer signed with the Edmonton Eskimos on May 14, 2015.

References

1989 births
Living people
Canadian football offensive linemen
Edmonton Elks players
People from Delta, British Columbia
Players of Canadian football from British Columbia
Washington State Cougars football players
Winnipeg Blue Bombers players